Truth is an album led pianist Duke Jordan recorded in 1975 but not released on the Danish SteepleChase label until 1983.

Reception

In his review for AllMusic, Ken Dryden said "Although the eight originals performed on this session (with two alternate takes added for the CD reissue) never became very well known as his hit "Jordu," there are a number of enjoyable tunes".

Track listing
All compositions by Duke Jordan
 "Layout Blues" - 5:42
 "32nd Street Love" - 5:33
 "Truth"  - 6:23
 "There's a Star for You" - 6:04
 "Misty Thursday" - 5:57
 "Hymn to Peace" - 5:04
 "Lady Linda" - 7:16
 "Night Train from Snekkersten" - 4:40 		
 "32nd Street Love" [Take 3] - 5:44 Bonus track on CD release 		
 "Layout Blues" [Take 1] - 3:03 Bonus track on CD release

Personnel
Duke Jordan - piano
Mads Vinding - bass 
Ed Thigpen - drums

References

1983 albums
Duke Jordan albums
SteepleChase Records albums